Barndioota may refer to:

Barndioota, South Australia, a locality and former town
Barndioota Road , a road in South Australia
Hundred of Barndioota, a cadastral unit in South Australia